Tourmaline is a crystalline boron silicate mineral 

 Tourmaline (activist) (born 1982), American activist, filmmaker, and writer 
 Tourmaline (band), an American rock band
 Tourmaline (novel), a 1963 novel by Randolph Stow
 Tourmaline Surfing Park, a public beach in San Diego, California, U.S.
 HMS Tourmaline (J339), a Royal Navy minesweeper
 , a U.S. Navy ship
 HMS Tourmaline, later HMS Cassandra, a Royal Navy destroyer
 "Tourmaline", a 2017 song by Aye Nako from Silver Haze